Joe Bartolo (born 6 November 1969) is an Australian former professional rugby league footballer who played on the  for the Parramatta Eels in the 1990s.

Bartolo made his debut for Parramatta in round 11 of the 1990 season against the Canberra Raiders. Bartolo spent five seasons at Parramatta and his final game for the club was in Round 22 of the 1995 season against the Penrith Panthers.

References

1969 births
Living people
Australian rugby league players
Parramatta Eels players
Rugby league wingers
Place of birth missing (living people)